The Stockton Borough School District was a community public school district that served students in pre-Kindergarten through sixth grade from Stockton, in Hunterdon County, New Jersey, United States. As of the 2014-15 school year, the school is part of the South Hunterdon Regional School District, which also serves students from Lambertville and West Amwell Township.

The school's student body of 43 made it the smallest operating school district in the State of New Jersey. Established in 1872, the district operated the oldest three-room schoolhouse in the state still in use, the District No. 98 Schoolhouse.

In a special election held in September 2013, voters from Lambertville, Stockton and West Amwell Township passed referendums to dissolve (and recreate) the South Hunterdon Regional School District and to combine the three existing K-6 school districts from each municipality (Lambertville City School District, Stockton Borough School District and West Amwell Township School District), with majorities in each community passing both ballot items. A single combined regional district would be created, serving students in pre-Kindergarten through twelfth grade, in which property taxes would be levied under a formula in which 57% is based on property values and 43% on the number of students. The executive county superintendent will appoint an interim board of education for the new regional district, which will be responsible for implementing the merger.

As of the 2011-12 school year, the district's one school had an enrollment of 43 students and 4.8 classroom teachers (on an FTE basis), for a student–teacher ratio of 8.96:1.

The district was classified by the New Jersey Department of Education as being in District Factor Group "FG", the fourth-highest of eight groupings. District Factor Groups organize districts statewide to allow comparison by common socioeconomic characteristics of the local districts. From lowest socioeconomic status to highest, the categories are A, B, CD, DE, FG, GH, I and J.

Public school students in seventh through twelfth grades attended the South Hunterdon Regional High School in Lambertville, part of the South Hunterdon Regional High School District, which also serves students from Lambertville and West Amwell Township attend South Hunterdon Regional High School.

School
The Stockton Borough School had an enrollment of 43 students as of the 2011-12 school year.  The Stockton School, founded in 1832, closed its doors after the 2017-2018 school year and its students were consolidated among the South Hunterdon Regional School District's two other elementary schools, Lambertville Public School and West Amwell School.

Administration
Core members of the district's administration are:
Suzanne Ivans, Chief School Administrator
Kris Nenna, Board Secretary
Gary Johnston, Business Administrator

References

External links
Stockton Borough School

School Data for the Stockton Borough School, National Center for Education Statistics

2014 disestablishments in New Jersey
School districts disestablished in 2014
New Jersey District Factor Group FG
School districts in Hunterdon County, New Jersey
Stockton, New Jersey